Gunhouse Hill is a mountain located in the Catskill Mountains of New York southwest of Harpersfield. Jaclyn Hill is located southeast, McMurdy Hill is located south, and Oak Hill is located south of Gunhouse Hill.

References

Mountains of Delaware County, New York
Mountains of New York (state)